Kildare South or South Kildare may refer to one of two parliamentary constituencies in County Kildare, Ireland:

 Kildare South (Dáil constituency) (since 2002)
 South Kildare (UK Parliament constituency)  (1885–1922)

See also
County Kildare